The Kura nase or southern Caspian nase (Chondrostoma cyri)  is a species of ray-finned fish in the genus Chondrostoma.

References 

 

Chondrostoma
Fish described in 1877